Zapata: el sueño del héroe (in English: Zapata: The dream of a hero), also titled simply Zapata, is a 2004 Mexican film.

This fictionalized portrayal of Emiliano Zapata, played by Alejandro Fernández, as an Indigenous Mexican, directed by Alfonso Arau, was reportedly the most expensive Mexican movie ever produced, with a massive ad campaign, and the largest ever opening in the nation's history. Unusual in the Mexican film industry, Zapata was financed independently.

Zapata made its U.S. debut at the Santa Fe Film Festival on December 3, 2004 at the  Center for Contemporary Arts in Santa Fe, New Mexico.

Plot 
The film happens in the last quarter of the 19th century and the first nineteen years of the twentieth, during the dictatorship of Porfirio Díaz, the presidency of Francisco I. Madero, the military revolt of Victoriano Huerta, the Convention of Generals and, finally, the death of Zapata, already in the constitutionalist stage of Venustiano Carranza. The film does not try to be a chair of history but a fable that obtains the identification of the spectators with the hero, through the successive confrontation of the protagonist with the power, represented in the antagonistic figure of Victoriano Huerta. In it, Emiliano Zapata appears like predestining, "the signal" in his chest, the mark or spot with the form of a little hand is the sign that identifies him as "the one" by the Huehuetlatolli (the heirs of the tradition) to be their guide. Thus, we see the birth of Emiliano, where he is recognized like the possible leader of his town. Zapata will have to break with his vision of the "real reality" and to enter in that other magical knowledge of the Mexican tradition and its inscrutable religious "sincretismo".

Cast (in credits order) 

Patricia Velásquez as Josefa
Lucero as Esperanza
Jesús Ochoa as Victoriano Huerta
Jaime Camil as Eufemio
Soledad Ruiz as Juana Lucia
Arturo Beristáin as González
Julio Bracho as Guajardo
Alberto Estrella as Martinez
José Luis Cruz
Ángeles Cruz
Evangelina Sosa as Azucena
Angélica Aragón as Mesera 1
Carmen Salinas as Mesera 2
Blanca Tenario as Mesera 3
Fernando Becerril as Presidente Francisco Madero
Juan Peláez
Miguel Couturier as Limantour
Justo Martínez as Porfirio Díaz
Gerardo Martínez as De la O
Rafael Cortés as Arturo
Alejandro Calva as Gilgerdo Magaña
Omar Sánchez as Otilio Montaña
Javier Escobar as Joaquin
Eduardo Ocaña as Pablo
Isi Rojano as Sobrina
Marcial Alejandro as Trovador
Francisco Badillo as Zapatista 1
Raymundo Ibarra as Zapatista 2
Mayolival Del Monte as Mujer Zapatista
Luis Enrique Parra as Francisco Villa
Sharmel Altamirano
Alejandra Palacios
Jaime Estrada as Gabriel Zapata
Angélica Lara as Madre de Zapata
Rafael Velasco as Don Lázaro
César Valdéz as Sargento
Julian Sedgwick as USA Ambassador
Paulino Hemmer as Secretario de Huerta
Gerardo Pérez
Alejandro Fernández as Emiliano Zapata
Omar Espino as Eufemio Niño
Paola Ayala as Josefa Niña
José Antonio Gutiérrez as Mensajero Federal
Eleno Guzmán as Soldado
Evangelina Martínez as Vieja
José María Negri as Sacerdote
Godofredo Villegas as Maestro de Ceremonias
Brenda Angulo as Prostituta
Carla Hernández as Prostituta
Tony Helling as Prostituta
Liliana Lago as Prostituta
Juana Ponce as Prostituta
Maria Guadalupe Hernández as Prostituta
Gabriela Tavela as Ama de llaves
Alfonso Garza as Marido celoso
Nayeli Márquez as Esposa Infiel
Luis Rubiera as Asistante de Gonzalez
Eduardo Francisco Galeano as Asistante de Gonzalez

Soundtrack

External links
Zapata: el sueño del héroe SpotLight

2004 films
2004 biographical drama films
2000s Spanish-language films
Nahuatl-language films
Biographical films about rebels
Films directed by Alfonso Arau
Mexican Revolution films
Films about Emiliano Zapata
2004 drama films
Mexican biographical drama films
2000s Mexican films